Carl Axel Holger Petersen (15 February 1902 – 27 September 1983) was a Danish long-distance runner. He competed in the men's 5000 metres at the 1928 Summer Olympics.

References

1902 births
1983 deaths
Athletes (track and field) at the 1928 Summer Olympics
Danish male long-distance runners
Olympic athletes of Denmark
Place of birth missing